Anne Seymour (September 11, 1909 – December 8, 1988) was an American film and television character actress.

Personal life
Anne Seymour Eckert was born in Manhattan to William Stanley and May Davenport (née Seymour) Eckert (1883–1967) an actress and later curator of the Museum of the City of New York. She was the seventh generation of a theatrical family traceable to 18th century Ireland. Seymour, her mother (May Davenport Seymour), and her brother (Bill Seymour) were all active in radio concurrently. 

Her great-uncle was character actor Harry Davenport, and her cousins were writer James Seymour and actor John Seymour. Seymour never married, and had no children.

Education
After attending St. Mary's for "her conventional education", Seymour studied at the American Laboratory Theatre.

Death
She died of heart failure at age 79 in Los Angeles, and is interred in Westwood Village Memorial Park Cemetery.

Career

Stage
Seymour's first professional activity as an entertainer came with the Jitney Players, for which she earned $15 per week.

She was in four Broadway productions. She played in At the Bottom and Puppet Show, both in 1930, and in The School for Scandal in 1931. Almost three decades later, she played Mrs. Sara Delano Roosevelt in Sunrise at Campobello.

Radio
Seymour debuted on radio in Cincinnati in 1932. According to the 06/25/1938 issue of WLS Radio's "Stand By" magazine Seymour was living in the north side of Chicago.  In the early 1940s, she played Prudence Dane, the leading female role in the "historic serial" A Woman of America and starred as Mary Marlin in The Story of Mary Marlin, both on NBC. She was also a member of the casts of Joyce Jordan, Girl Interne, Tom Bradley, Against the Storm, and King Arthur, Junior.

Television
Seymour's first venture in television was a three-month role in Follow Your Heart, an NBC soap opera. "I hated every minute of it," she said. She also "had a running part on a CBS soap opera called The First Hundred Years." She played Mrs. Barr in season 1, episode 15 of My Three Sons in 1961. She later starred in Empire, a 1962–63 series set in the modern American West. Turning her talents to comedy, she was a regular on The Tim Conway Show in 1970.

She was a guest star on many American television series in the 1960s and 1970s. She appeared in two episodes of Perry Mason; in 1963 she played Hettie Randall in "The Case of the Festive Felon", and in 1964 she played Bonnie Mae Wilmet in "The Case of the Bullied Bowler". She portrayed Amelia Tarbell in Pollyanna (1960), Esther in the episode "Final Escape" of Alfred Hitchcock Presents (1985), and Miss Tilford in A Tree Grows in Brooklyn. In a 1965 episode of Hazel entitled "A 'Lot' to Remember", she played Laura Kirkland. 

She played Ms. Frost in "A Visit to Upright", a 1972 episode of Bonanza, as well as three different characters in four episodes of Gunsmoke: "Snow Train Parts 1 & 2", "The Wake", and "Kitty's Injury". In the spring of 1970, she was a regular cast member of the situation comedy The Tim Conway Show, playing airport and airline owner Mrs. K. J. Crawford during the shows 12-episode run. She guest-starred in the episode "Involvement" of Emergency! that first aired on January 24, 1976 (Season 5, Episode 17). She played the role of Millie Eastman, a retired head nurse of Rampart General who tried to commit  suicide by overdosing on pills. During her recovery at Rampart, she is placed in a semi-private room with Jean Clark (Dawn Lyn) whom she starts mentoring for emotional support.

Film
An early film appearance by Seymour was in All the King's Men (1949) as Mrs. Lucy Stark.  She played the role of Grandma Beebe in the 1961 children's film classic Misty, a  screen adaptation of Marguerite Henry's children's book, Misty of Chincoteague.  Her last performance was in 1988, in the feature film Field of Dreams, which was released after her death.

Radio appearances

Film appearances

References

External links

1909 births
1988 deaths
Actresses from New York City
American film actresses
American radio actresses
American television actresses
Burials at Westwood Village Memorial Park Cemetery
20th-century American actresses